Minnesota State Highway 89 (MN 89) is a  highway in northwest Minnesota, which runs from its intersection with U.S. Highway 2 at Eckles Township, just north of Wilton (near Bemidji) and continues north to its northern terminus at the Canadian border, where it becomes Manitoba Highway 89, near Pinecreek.

The highway runs around the west side of Red Lake between Bemidji and Roseau.  "Moose" signs can be seen along this route.

Route description
Highway 89 serves as a north–south route between Bemidji, Red Lake, Grygla, Roseau, and the Canadian border.

The route is also known as 5th Avenue SW in the city of Roseau.

Hayes Lake State Park is located 9 miles east of the junction of Highway 89 and Roseau County Road 4.  The park entrance is located on Roseau County Road 4.

This is the longest concurrency with another state highway within Minnesota.

A new U.S. Highway 2 interchange with State Highway 89 in Eckles Township is planned for 2012.

The route is legally defined as Legislative Routes 136 and 218 in the Minnesota Statutes. It is not marked with these numbers.

History
Highway 89 was authorized in 1933 from U.S. 2 near Bemidji to State Highway 11 at Roseau.  The route was extended in 1949 from State Highway 11 to the Canadian border.

The route was mostly gravel in 1953.  The last section to be paved was the west side of Red Lake, .

Adjoining Manitoba Highway 89 was numbered to correspond with Minnesota Highway 89.

Major intersections

References

089
Transportation in Beltrami County, Minnesota
Transportation in Marshall County, Minnesota
Transportation in Roseau County, Minnesota